This is a list of articles relating to present and past types of local government in the United Kingdom.

By country

By sub-division

Related concepts 

 Area committee
 Combined authority
 County
 County council
 Local enterprise partnership
 ONS coding system
 Overview and Scrutiny
 Passenger transport executive
 Police authority
 Police [fire] and crime commissioner
 Principal area
 Regional assembly (England) (defunct by 2010)
 Township (England)
 Waste disposal authorities in London

Lists 

 International Territorial Level (replaced NUTS in 2021)
 ITL 1 statistical regions of England
 List of counties of the United Kingdom
 List of civil parishes in England
 List of English districts by ethnicity
 List of rural and urban districts in England in 1973
 List of Welsh areas by percentage of Welsh-speakers
 List of communities in Wales
 List of rural and urban districts in Wales in 1973
 List of burghs in Scotland

Historical 

 1990s UK local government reform
 Administrative county
 Association of British Counties (pressure group)
 County corporate
 Local board of health
 Police burgh
 Poor law union
 Registration district
 Registration county
 Sanitary district

Legislation, reports and papers 

 Municipal Corporations Act 1835
 Metropolis Management Act 1855
 Local Government Act 1858
 Local Government Act 1888
 Local Government (Scotland) Act 1889
 Local Government Act 1894
 Local Government (Ireland) Act 1898
 London Government Act 1899
 Local Government Act 1929
 London Government Act 1963
 Redcliffe-Maud Report (1969)
 Local Government Act 1972
 Streamlining the cities (1983)
 Local Government Act 1985
 Local Government 1964Act 1988
 Local Government etc. (Scotland) Act 1994
 Local Government (Wales) Act 1994
 Greater London Authority Act 1999
 Local Government Act 2000 (applies to England and Wales only)
 Regional Assemblies (Preparations) Act 2003 (applies to England only)
 Local Governance (Scotland) Act 2004

See also
Administrative geography of the United Kingdom
Political make-up of local councils in the United Kingdom

External links 

 Map of the UK counties and unitary administrations
 Map of all UK local authorities

 01
Lists of subdivisions of the United Kingdom
United Kingdom politics-related lists
United Kingdom